The 2015 Sheikh Jassim Cup was the 37th edition of the cup competition for football teams from Qatar. It was changed from a group staged pre-season tournament featuring all Qatari Stars League sides, to a one-off match between the previous seasons Qatar Stars League winners and Emir of Qatar Cup winners.

Match details

References

2015
2015–16 in Qatari football